Tommy Larsson (born 7 September 1951) is a Swedish former footballer who played as a midfielder.

References

External links

1951 births
Association football midfielders
Swedish footballers
Allsvenskan players
Malmö FF players
Living people
Sweden international footballers